St Barnabas Hospital is a non-profit teaching hospital founded in 1866. The hospital is located in the Belmont neighborhood of The Bronx in New York City. It is a level II adult trauma center and is a major clinical affiliate for clinical clerkship of the New York Institute of Technology College of Osteopathic Medicine.

History 
St Barnabas Hospital, originally known as the Home for the Incurables, was founded in 1866 by Reverend Washington Rodman, of the Grace Episcopal Church in West Farms, Bronx. The hospital became the first chronic disease hospital and was housed in a modest frame house and could serve 33 patients. The hospital moved to its present location on Third Avenue in 1874 where by 1911 it could accommodate 300 beds. Support for the non-profit hospital came from New York Society including Cornelius Vanderbilt (who served on the hospital's Board of Managers), John Jacob Astor, Theodore Roosevelt and Frederick Law Olmsted. Between 1926 and 1931, the hospital added three new buildings to the hospital and in 1947, the hospital changed its name to St Barnabas Hospital. In 1969, St Barnabas broke ground for a six-story West Wing with 188 beds, a cafeteria and kitchen. St Barnabas Nursing Home was founded in 1972, and is located on the hospital's campus at 2175 Quarry Rd.

In 1983, Dr. Ronald Gade was promoted to the hospital's president from head of radiology and worked to make the hospital more efficient in its care of patients. He reduced the staff size, discouraged long hospital stays, and greatly increased income from Medicaid due to improvements. His implementations at St Barnabas challenged the medical establishment by creating a managed-care revolution in American medicine. By the late 1990s, the hospital won two city contracts worth almost $450 million, one to provide doctors for Lincoln Hospital in the South Bronx, the other to care for prisoners on Rikers Island. In the 1990s, the hospital received state designation as a Level 2 Trauma Center and created an AIDS Center and Stroke Center.

The hospital is a major clinical teaching site for the New York College of Osteopathic Medicine. In 2016, the hospital also became an affiliate of CUNY School of Medicine to recruit underrepresented minorities into medicine, increase medical care in underserved communities, and boost the number of primary care physicians.

Notable personnel
 Dr. Irving S. Cooper – developed cryothalamectomy as a surgical technique for primary control of tremor in patients with Parkinson's disease during his employment (1954–1977)
 Dr. Humayun Chaudhry - Completed residency at St. Barnabas. Became Commissioner of Health Services for Suffolk County, New York. He later became CEO of the Federation of State Medical Boards.
 Dr. Richard F. Daines – Served as Senior Vice President for Professional Affairs and Medical Director. After leaving St. Barnabas Hospital, he became the president of St. Luke's-Roosevelt Hospital Center (now Mount Sinai Morningside) in Manhattan. Still later, he became the New York State Health Commissioner
 Victor M. Pichardo - Vice President for Community and Government Affairs. He was previously a New York State Assembly member.

Deaths of notable people
 Bryant Baker (1881–1970) sculptor
 Emanuel Balaban (1895–1973) pianist
 Reginald Bathurst Birch (1856–1943) illustrator
 Benjamin Feigenbaum (1860 – 1932) Yiddish socialist, newspaper editor, translator, and satirist.
Lesandro “Junior” Guzman-Feliz (2002-2018) victim of gang violence, On June 20, 2018, 15-year-old Lesandro Guzman-Feliz was killed by members of the Dominican gang Trinitario in the Belmont neighborhood of the Bronx. The death occurred in a case of mistaken identity.
 The Mighty Hannibal (1939-2014), James Timothy Shaw, R&B, soul and funk singer, songwriter.
 Abraham Hirschfeld (1919–2005), real estate investor, Broadway producer
 Electus D. Litchfield (1872–1952) architect
 Annie Mack Berlein (c. 1850 - June 22, 1935) Irish-born American actress.
 Gustave Verbeek (1867–1937), cartoonist

See also
 List of hospitals in the Bronx
  Cooperman Barnabas Medical Center

References

External links
Official website

Hospitals in the Bronx
Hospitals established in 1866
Hospital buildings completed in 1874
1866 establishments in New York (state)
Belmont, Bronx
Teaching hospitals in New York City